Tajikistan competed at the 2016 Summer Olympics in Rio de Janeiro, Brazil, from 5 to 21 August 2016. This was the nation's sixth consecutive appearance at the Summer Olympics in the post-Soviet era.

The National Olympic Committee of the Republic of Tajikistan sent the nation's smallest delegation to the Olympics since 2000. Seven athletes, five men and two women, were selected to the Tajikistan team across four different sports (athletics, boxing, judo, and swimming). For the first time since its official debut in 1996, Tajikistan did not register any of its athletes in wrestling at these Games.

Among the nation's athletes on the roster were London 2012 lightweight boxer Anvar Yunusov, 15-year-old freestyle swimmer Anastasia Tyurina, who made history as Tajikistan's youngest ever Olympian, and hammer thrower and reigning Asian Games champion Dilshod Nazarov, who became the first ever Tajikistani to compete in four successive Olympic Games. The oldest and most experienced participant (aged 30), Nazarov reprised his role to lead the Tajikistan delegation for the second time as the team captain and flag bearer in the opening ceremony, the first having done so eight years earlier in Beijing.

Tajikistan left Rio de Janeiro with a historic first Olympic gold medal, won by Nazarov.

Medalists

Athletics
 
Tajik athletes have so far achieved qualifying standards in the following athletics events (up to a maximum of 3 athletes in each event):

Track & road events

Field events

Boxing
 
Tajikistan entered one boxer to compete in the men's lightweight division in the Olympic boxing tournament. London 2012 Olympian Anvar Yunusov claimed his Olympic place with a quarterfinal victory at the 2016 AIBA World Qualifying Tournament in Baku, Azerbaijan.

Judo
 
Tajikistan qualified two judokas for each of the following weight classes at the Games: Men's -90kg and Men's +100 kg. Komronshokh Ustopiriyon was ranked among the top 22 eligible judokas for men in the IJF World Ranking List of May 30, 2016, while Mukhamadmurod Abdurakhmonov at men's half-heavyweight (+100 kg) earned a continental quota spot from the Asian region, as the highest-ranked Tajik judoka outside of direct qualifying position.

Swimming

Tajikistan received a Universality invitation from FINA to send two swimmers (one male and one female) to the Olympics.

References

External links 
 

Olympics
Nations at the 2016 Summer Olympics
2016